The 2008 Nebraska Cornhuskers football team represented the University of Nebraska–Lincoln in the 2008 NCAA Division I FBS football season. The team was coached by Bo Pelini and played their home games at Memorial Stadium in Lincoln, Nebraska.

Before the season
Pelini returned to Nebraska as Head Coach after a previous one-year stint as Defensive Coordinator for Nebraska in 2003. At the conclusion of the 2003 season, Pelini was appointed as Interim Head Coach, following the firing of Frank Solich, for Nebraska's appearance in the Alamo Bowl against the Michigan State Spartans, a contest in which Nebraska triumphed 17–3, leaving Nebraska with a final AP Poll ranking of 19 and Coaches Poll ranking of 18.  Despite this performance and significant fan support, Pelini was passed over as Solich's permanent replacement in favor of Bill Callahan.  During Pelini's absence from Nebraska, he served as Co-Defensive Coordinator for the Oklahoma Sooners in 2004, and Defensive Coordinator for the LSU Tigers for 2005–2007  prior to his return to Nebraska following the dismissal of Callahan.

Schedule

Roster and coaching staff

Game summaries

Western Michigan

Nebraska opened the season with expectations below average after finishing 5–7 in 2007. However, there was a buzz in the air as first year head coach Bo Pelini returned to Lincoln to improve a maligned defense and to re-energize the program. Nebraska played very well as the defense seemed much improved from 2007. LB Cody Glenn was the bright spot on defense and seemed to be in on almost every play. The offense continued to be as productive as usual with Joe Ganz at quarterback, en route to a 47–24 win.

San José State

Nebraska came into its second game of the year with a little more certainty. San Jose State quickly put a stop to that. The Spartans marched all over Nebraska's defense on the first drive with Kyle Reed scoring on a 12-yard run. Nebraska scored two touchdowns to recapture the lead going into the second quarter. The game turned mostly defensive with San Jose State scoring field goals in the second and fourth quarters. After San Jose State's field goal in the fourth quarter, Niles Paul returned the kickoff 85 yards for a Nebraska touchdown. The return sparked the Cornhuskers as they scored three more touchdowns sealing the game.

New Mexico State

Nebraska, entering the game 2–0, felt confident going against the New Mexico State Aggies who were playing their first game of the season. On their second drive, the Aggies went down the field with ease only to have their field goal kick blocked by Zach Potter. Nebraska's offense finally looked like it came together, scoring 35 points. The scoring included Marlon Lucky taking a toss and throwing it downfield to quarterback Joe Ganz and then Ganz running 33 yards on an option play.

Virginia Tech

Nebraska, 3–0, headed into the Virginia Tech game looking for a win over a ranked team in the first year of Bo Pelini's first year. Virginia Tech got on the board first, blocking a Dan Titchner punt for a safety. The Hokies controlled the game for most of the night, until senior Nate Swift returned a punt 88 yards for a touchdown in the fourth quarter. The Cornhuskers needed a big defensive stop and seemed to have got it on a 3rd down run by Tyrod Taylor. Taylor was tackled out of bounds, but Nebraska defense tackle Ndamukong Suh appeared to have leaped on top of Taylor, prompting an official to throw a flag for a late hit. Bo Pelini, obviously upset, berated the official about the call until the official threw another flag for an unsportsmanlike conduct penalty on Coach Pelini. The penalties put Virginia Tech near the end zone and continued the Hokies' drive, which resulted in Taylor scoring a touchdown to ice the game.

Missouri

Missouri came into this game having not won in Lincoln since 1978. That streak was broken as Missouri won by a wide margin, scoring in bunches. After a close first quarter which saw Nebraska tie the game, the Tigers pulled away, building a three touchdown halftime lead. The Cornhuskers were set back by 14 penalties for 101 yards. Tigers on the other hand were not forced to punt in the game. Nebraska managed to make the final score a little more respectable with a late touchdown and by stopping Missouri on fourth down earlier in the quarter.

Texas Tech

After being routed by Missouri, Nebraska was expecting more of the same against Texas Tech. Instead, they found themselves in the midst of a battle. Todd Peterson caught a touchdown pass with :29 left to tie the game at 31 forcing it into overtime. In overtime, the Red Raiders scored a touchdown but had their extra point blocked, opening the door for Nebraska to win. However, on 2nd down, Joe Ganz' pass was intercepted by cornerback Jamar Wall, ending the game. This was Nebraska's first overtime loss in school history.

Iowa State

Playing Iowa State was the trick for Nebraska to solve their three-game losing streak. Nebraska roared to a 21–0 lead at halftime. Iowa State stifled Nebraska's offense for the third quarter and scored a touchdown of their own, but going into the fourth, Nebraska took back momentum, scoring twice to finish off the Cyclones.

Baylor

Nebraska let Baylor jump on them for a 20–17 lead going into the half. Nebraska came back from a halftime deficit for the first time since 2003, scoring 15 points in the third and fourth quarters including a safety and a 9-yard touchdown catch by Nate Swift, a catch that broke Johnny Rodgers' record for career catches.

Oklahoma

Nebraska ran into an offensive explosion in Norman and in a matter of minutes was down 35–0. Three first-quarter turnovers doomed the Cornhuskers as Oklahoma capitalized on all of them. Nebraska fought through the circumstances to put up a respectable 28 points as the Cornhuskers looked to regroup.

Kansas

Nebraska vowed the start of a new season heading into this game, one that consisted of three games. Needing only one win to become bowl eligible, Nebraska played exceptional on a frigid day in Lincoln. Nebraska and Kansas went blow for blow until the fourth quarter when a 52-yard touchdown run by Roy Helu Jr. and a 2-yard touchdown catch by Ndamukong Suh opened up the game for Nebraska.

Kansas State

Nebraska felt confident heading into Manhattan against Kansas State as lame-duck coach Ron Prince had never beaten them, nor had former Nebraska commit, Josh Freeman. Also, Nebraska's defense got their blackshirts back for the first time this season. Nebraska made a crucial mistake early allowing a 57-yard interception return for a touchdown. Barring that play and a long touchdown pass by Freeman, Nebraska played sparkling defense in the first half. Kansas State scored only twice more one on a methodical drive by backup Carson Coffmann and a kickoff return by Brandon Banks.

Colorado

Colorado came into this game fighting for bowl eligibility at 5–6. Nebraska had already secured a spot in a bowl game, but a win would help improve where they would be headed. Colorado would have none of it, taking an early 14–0 lead. Nebraska came back taking a 24–17 edge and was looking to add on going into the half. On a fake field goal play, holder Jake Wesch was supposed to flip it over his head and kicker Alex Henery was supposed to catch it and throw it, a play that was made against Kansas. This time, Colorado's Jimmy Smith picked off the flip in mid-air and returned it 58 yards to tie the game. Late in the fourth quarter, Nebraska trailed 31–30 and had the ball deep in the Buffalo's territory when Patrick Mahnke sacked Joe Ganz for a 15-yard loss, setting up a 4th & 25. It looked like Nebraska was out of Alex Henery's field goal range with the kick being 57 yards. Bo Pelini sent his kicker out anyway after Henery told him he could do it. With 1:55 left, he kicked the 57 yarder, giving Nebraska the 33–31 lead. On Colorado's next drive, Cody Hawkins pass was deflected by Zach Potter and intercepted by Ndamukong Suh who stiff armed Hawkins and rumbled 30 yards for a touchdown, icing the game at 40–31 and sending Colorado home with no bowl. Nebraska finished the regular season 8–4 and Big 12 North Co-Division Champions with Missouri.

Clemson

Nebraska defeated Clemson in a come-from-behind 26–21 finish at the 2009 Gator Bowl on January 1, 2009.  All 21 of Clemson's points came following Nebraska turnovers.  The outcome remained in doubt until the end, as Clemson marched from their own 23 to the Nebraska 10.  With 1st and goal to go and about two minutes remaining on the clock, the Blackshirts made their stand, resulting in a 16-yard sack and three Clemson incomplete passes to seal the game. The game was played only days after head coach Bo Pelini and defensive coordinator Carl Pelini returned from their father's funeral in Ohio.

Rankings

Statistics

Team

After the season
The reputation of the Blackshirts, whose trademark black jerseys quietly disappeared during the disappointing 5–7 (2–6) 2007 season, was restored with emphasis during 2008 as the coveted black jerseys were once again distributed to defensive starters on November 11 following a key emotional win over the Kansas Jayhawks.

The season concluded January 1, 2009 with a come-from-behind 26–21 Nebraska victory over the Clemson Tigers in the 2009 Gator Bowl.  Nebraska finished as co-division Champions of the Big 12 North Division, with a final record of 9–4 (5–3).  Head Coach Bo Pelini's overall career record improved to 10–4 (.714), 5–3 in conference, and 2–0 in bowl games.  Pelini's 2008 regular season record of 9–4 was the highest among all 28 Division 1A teams with new head coaches and staffs that year.

Awards

Draft picks, signees, or other future professional players
Prince Amukamara, 2011 1st–round pick of the New York Giants
Larry Asante, 2010 4th–round pick of the Cleveland Browns
 Chris Brooks, 2010 free agent signee of Tampa Bay Buccaneers
Phillip Dillard, 2010 4th–round pick of the New York Giants
 Joe Ganz, 2009 free agent signee of Washington Redskins
Cody Glenn, 2009 5th–round pick of the Washington Redskins
Eric Hagg, 2011 7th–round pick of the Cleveland Browns
Roy Helu, 2011 4th–round pick of the Washington Redskins
Alex Henery, 2011 4th–round pick of the Philadelphia Eagles
 Ricky Henry, 2011 UFL 1st–round pick of the Hartford Colonials
 D.J. Jones, 2011 UFL 6th–round pick of the Omaha Nighthawks
Marlon Lucky, 2009 free agent signee of Cincinnati Bengals
Lydon Murtha, 2009 7th–round pick of the Miami Dolphins
 Matt O'Hanlon, 2010 free agent signee of Carolina Panthers
Niles Paul, 2011 5th–round pick of the Washington Redskins
 Todd Peterson, 2009 free agent signee of Jacksonville Jaguars
Zach Potter, 2009 free agent signee of New York Jets
Matt Slauson, 2009 6th–round pick of the New York Jets
 Mike Smith, 2011 UFL 5th–round pick of the Omaha Nighthawks
 Ty Steinkuhler, 2009 free agent signee of New York Jets
Ndamukong Suh, 2010 1st–round pick of the Detroit Lions
Nate Swift, 2009 free agent signee of Denver Broncos
Barry Turner, 2010 free agent signee of Detroit Lions
Keith Williams, 2011 6th–round pick of the Pittsburgh Steelers

References

Nebraska
Nebraska Cornhuskers football seasons
Gator Bowl champion seasons
Nebraska Cornhuskers football